Sea cadets are members of a sea cadet corps, a formal uniformed youth organisation for young people with an interest in waterborne activities and or the national navy. The organisation may be sponsored in whole or in part by the navy or a naval supporter's organisation. In the United Kingdom, sea cadets are governed by the parent charity MSSC (Marine Society & Sea Cadets) and receives just over half of its funding from the Ministry of Defence. The Royal Navy is its principal supporter, but it is not a pre-service organisation and works in partnerships with the broader maritime community as well. The various organisations are listed in alphabetical order of their nation.

Sea cadet organisations exist in most of the maritime nations of the world. As described by the International Sea Cadet Association:

Organisations
 :
Australian Navy Cadets formed from the Australian Naval Reserve Cadet Corps and the Navy League Sea Cadet Corps
Navy League Sea Cadet Corps
 : Royal Belgian Sea Cadet Corps
 :
Navy League Wrennette Corps
Royal Canadian Sea Cadets
Navy League Cadet Corps (Canada)
 : 
 National cadets of Germany
 : Hong Kong Sea Cadet Corps
 : Sea Cadet Corps (India)
 : Junior Sea Friends' Federation of Japan
 : Sea Explorers of Korea
 : Sea Cadet Corps The Netherlands (Zeekadetkorps Nederland)
 : 
 New Zealand Sea Cadet Corps
 Sea Cadet Association of New Zealand, the supporters group for the NZSCC
 : Portugal Sea Cadet Corps (Corpo de Cadetes do Mar de Portugal)
 : Sea Cadet Corps (Russia)
 : Singapore National Cadet Corps (Sea)
 : Sea Cadet Corps (South Africa)
 : Swedish Sea Cadet Corps
 :
Girls' Nautical Training Corps
Sea Cadets (Formally known as the "Sea Cadet Corps" in the UK, the first such named organisation in the world. Renamed and re-branded to "Sea Cadets" in 2011)
Marine Society & Sea Cadets – parent charity of the Sea Cadet Corps, following the merger of the Sea Cadet Association and the Marine Society
  (British Overseas Territory): Bermuda Sea Cadet Corps
 : 
United States Naval Sea Cadet Corps 
Navy League Cadet Corps
 
Zimbabwe Sea Cadet Corps

See also
 Reserve Forces and Cadets Association
 Sea scouts

References